The Delfina Foundation is an independent, non-profit foundation dedicated to facilitating artistic exchange and developing creative practice through residencies, partnerships and public programming.

About 
Delfina Foundation was founded in 2007 by Delfina Entrecanales CBE, as the successor to Delfina Studio Trust, initially with an intention to nurture artists from Africa, South Asia and the Middle East. The foundation now works internationally with thematic (rather than geographic) programmes, which have explored a range of topics including, the politics of food, the public domain, performance, science and technology, and collecting.

Residencies for artists, writers and curators form the core of Delfina Foundation's work as it seeks to support and facilitate the professional development of cultural practitioners, from emerging to established art professionals. The foundation is London's largest provider of international residencies.

The foundation began working around seasonal thematic programmes in 2014, when it reopened following an expansion of its Edwardian townhouse premises in Victoria, London. These themes are explored through residencies and public programming, including exhibitions, talks, performances, screenings and commissions.

Building 
Since its founding, Delfina Foundation has been located in Catherine Place, in Victoria, London. Initially the foundation occupied the Edwardian house at number 29, but in 2009 the foundation's patron Delfina Entrecanales bought the adjoining property allowing the foundation to expand and span the two houses. The expansion and renovation of the facility at 29-31 Catherine Place in 2014 was undertaken by London-based architects Studio Octopi and Egypt-based Shahira Fahmy Architects, the winners of a competition that promoted design collaboration between architects based in the UK and the greater Middle East. The £1.4m project doubled the residency capacity (from 4 to 8) and created 1,650 square feet of additional exhibition and event space, giving it a combined total area of 4,564 square feet, and making it London's largest artist residency provider.

In addition to the 8 bedrooms and exhibition space the property includes a communal kitchen area, an outdoor terrace and courtyard, the foundation's offices, and a library/resource room, which includes reference books, magazines, and other archives.

Residency Programme 
Residencies for art practitioners - including artists, writers, curators and collectors - form the core of Delfina Foundation's work. The residency programme brings together practitioners, at various stages in their career, from around the world, who are exploring common ideas and practices. The programme seeks to give practitioners time and space to incubate their ideas as well as opportunities to showcase them. To date the foundation has supported over 400 residencies.

Since its physical expansion in 2014, the foundation is able to host 6 to 8 residents at a time in its premises in Catherine Place. Practitioners are selected for residencies that last up to three-months through solicited proposals or nominations, or through targeted open calls. Since the foundation's shift to thematic programmes in 2014, this guides the open call and selection process and the foundation no longer has an overarching geographical remit that informs its residencies.

In addition to residencies at 29/31 Catherine Place, London, in the past the foundation has also provided residencies in a number of other locations in collaboration with various partner institutions, including in Beirut (2009), Bethlehem (2010), Damascus (2009 and 2010), Dubai (2011, 2012, 2013, 2014, 2016), Granada (2008), Halabja (2009), Muscat (2012), Ramallah (2012), and São Paulo (2012).

In 2017, as part of its thematic programme Collecting as Practice, the foundation supported a series of residencies for collectors. The collectors who undertook residencies, living alongside the artists in residence, were Alain Servais, Pedro Barbosa, Dorith Galuz, Lu Xun, Luba Michailova, Daisuke Miyatsu and Rudy Tseng.

Thematic Programmes 
Following its re-opening after the transformation of its building in 2014, Delfina Foundation initiated its new thematic programme structure. These themes inform the selection of residents, the hosting of exhibitions, and a public programme of events.

Programmes have included:
 Collecting as Practice: Initiated in spring 2017.
 Performance as Process (2 stages): Initiated in winter 2015, with a second stage in spring 2016, a third in spring 2018, and a fourth in winter 2020.
 The Politics of Food (3 seasons): Initiated spring in 2014, with a second season in spring 2015, a third  in summer 2016, and a fourth in spring 2019.
science_technology_society (2 seasons):  Initiated in autumn 2019, with a second season in autumn 2020.
Autonomy: Initiated in autumn 2014.
 The Public Domain (2 seasons): Initiated in winter 2014, with a second season in autumn 2015.

Delfina Studio Trust 
Delfina Foundation is the successor to the Delfina Studio Trust which opened in 1988 to provide free studios and related facilities for artists at a crucial time in the development of the British art scene. Initially these studios were located in an empty space above a jeans factory in East Stratford. The trust's founder Delfina Entrecanales CBE paid the rent and with the Royal College Arts invited a number of British artists to have a studio there for two years and foreign artists to have a studio and living accommodation for one year, all free of charge. For the first ten years the trust organised an annual exhibition by resident artists. In 1992 the trust moved to a converted chocolate factory at 50 Bermondsey Street. The new premises provided an exhibition space and 34 studios. Twelve studios were normally awarded as a prize with all related facilities provided free of charge for one or two years, and the remaining studios were rented at a heavily subsidised rate. The studios were notable for including a restaurant in the building, at which a communal table was designated for the resident artists who could eat lunch there for £1.

Following a trip to Syria in 2005, Delfina Entrecanales realised that artists there were also struggling to find work space. In 2007 the Delfina Studio Trust was reinvented as the Delfina Foundation, opening in its current location in Victoria with a renewed focus on artists from North Africa and the Middle East. Over its 20 years the trust supported over 400 artists and counts among its alumni artists a dozen Turner Prize winners and nominees such as including Shirazeh Houshiary, Jane & Louise Wilson, Mark Wallinger, Anya Gallacio, Tacita Dean, Glenn Brown, Mark Titchner, Martin Creed, Goshka Macuga, and Tomoko Takahashi.

Collaborations 
Delfina Foundation works extensively through international partnerships. Current and past partnerships include:
 A.I.R Dubai: An annual artists residency programme in partnership between Art Dubai, Dubai Culture and Arts Authority and Tashkeel, focused on artists based in the United Arab Emirates.
 Residency for Indian artists and curators: A collaboration with Charles Wallace India Trust and Inlaks Shivdasani Foundation, offering a three-month residency to a curator with Indian citizenship, living and working in India.
 Brooks International Fellowship Programme: A programme that calls for artists, curators and art historian, in collaboration with Tate, to apply for a three-month art residency to be part of Tate team, working at the gallery on a day-to-day basis and taking part in wider activities.
 Samdani Art Award: A bi-annual award that aims to support, promote and highlight emerging contemporary artists of Bangladesh in collaboration with Samdani Art Foundation and Bangladesh National Academy of Fine and Performing Arts.
 Mate: An annual residency for a Peruvian artist in collaboration with MATE Museo Mario Testino.
 The Silent University: a knowledge exchange platform by refugees, asylum seekers and migrants at Tate Modern, started in 2012 by artist Ahmet Ogut. It is led by a group of lecturers, consultants and research fellows.
 SAHA Association: Partnership with SAHA since 2013 on developing residency opportunities for Turkish cultural practitioners.
 Decolonizing Architecture Art Residency: An annual residency programme for UK artists and architects in Palestine in collaboration with DAAR.

Exhibitions

References

External links
 

2007 establishments in England
Arts organizations established in 2007
Art galleries established in 2007
Art museums and galleries in London
Non-profit organisations based in the United Kingdom